Amassakoul ("The Traveler" in Tamashek) is a 2004 album by the Tuareg band Tinariwen. In a review of the album, Chris Nickson of AllMusic stated, "This is angry and passionate; it's dangerous music in the very best sense. Western bands might have forgotten how to rock as if their lives depended on it; Tinariwen can teach them." Jon Lusk of the BBC noted, "you'll be happy to discover that this music has a similar power to transport you to the heats of the Sahara." In a review of the album, PopMatters concluded that "this is a band whose music is not only mesmerizing but is destined to find wide appeal to many listeners of all ages."

The song "Chet Boghassa" on this album was later covered by Mdou Moctar.

Track listing

Personnel
All information from album liner notes.

 Ibrahim Ag Alhabib – lead vocals and lead guitar (tracks 1, 2, 3, 7, 8, 9, 11), guitar (tracks 6, 9, 10), flute (tracks 7, 9, 11), backing vocals (tracks 4, 5, 6, 10, 11)
 Abdallah Ag Alhousseyni – lead vocals and lead guitar (tracks 4, 5), guitar (tracks 8, 10), percussion (tracks 2, 9), backing vocals (all tracks except 4, 5, 7)
 Alhassane Ag Touhami – lead vocals and lead guitar (tracks 6, 10), guitar (tracks 1, 2), backing vocals (tracks 1, 2, 3, 4, 5, 8, 9, 11)
 Eyadou Ag Leche – bass (all tracks except 7, 9, 11), backing vocals (all tracks except 7), percussion (tracks 1, 2, 5, 8, 9, 10)
 Elaga Ag Hamid – guitar (all tracks except 7, 11), backing vocals (all tracks except 7)
 Said Ag Ayad – percussion (all tracks except 7, 11), backing vocals (all tracks except 3, 4, 7)
 Bakaye Ag Ayad – percussion (all tracks except 4, 7, 11)
 Mina Walet Oumar – backing vocals (all tracks except 7, 10)
 Wounou Walet Oumar – backing vocals (tracks except 2, 4)
 Issa Dicko – backing vocals (track 2)
 Bastien Gsell – flute (track 9), didjeridoo (track 11)

References 

2004 albums
Tinariwen albums